"Get Up, Stand Up" is song written by Bob Marley and Peter Tosh.

Get Up, Stand Up may also refer to:
"Get Up Stand Up" (Stellar Project song), 2004
"Get Up, Stand Up" (Phunky Phantom song), 1997
Get Up Stand Up (album), a 1998 album by Shabba Ranks
 Get Up, Stand Up: The Story of Pop and Politics, a 2003 television documentary series
"Get Up Stand Up", a song by Patrick Andy
Get Up, Stand Up, a 2011 book by psychologist Bruce E. Levine
"Get Up, Stand Up", a 2013 episode of Grey's Anatomy
"Get Up, Stand Up", a 2021 episode of Grey's Anatomy spin-off Station 19
Get Up, Stand Up! The Bob Marley Musical, an upcoming 2021 musical based on the life of Bob Marley written by Lee Hall